Seh Sar (also Romanized as Seh Sār) is a village in Gurab Zarmikh Rural District, Mirza Kuchek Janghli District, Sowme'eh Sara County, Gilan Province, Iran. At the 2006 census, its population was 1,425, in 338 families.

References 

Populated places in Sowme'eh Sara County